Dialyceras coriaceum is a tree in the family Sphaerosepalaceae. It is endemic to Madagascar.

Distribution and habitat
Dialyceras coriaceum is known only from populations in the northeastern regions of Sava, Analanjirofo and Atsinanana. Its habitat is humid evergreen forests from sea-level to  altitude. Some populations are within protected areas.

Threats
Dialyceras coriaceum is threatened by cyclones and shifting patterns of agriculture. Because lemurs disperse the tree's seeds, threats to the lemur would in turn affect the tree's reproduction.

References

Sphaerosepalaceae
Endemic flora of Madagascar
Trees of Madagascar
Plants described in 1962
Flora of the Madagascar lowland forests
Taxa named by René Paul Raymond Capuron